Cardaccio is a surname. Notable people with the surname include:

 Alberto Cardaccio (1949–2015), Uruguayan footballer
 Jorge Daniel Cardaccio (born 1959), Uruguayan footballer 
 Mathías Cardaccio (born 1987), Uruguayan footballer